Nemesszentandrás is a village in Zala County, Hungary.

References

External links

Populated places in Zala County